Mammoth is an unincorporated community in Kanawha County, West Virginia, United States. Mammoth has a post office with ZIP code 25132.

References 

Unincorporated communities in Kanawha County, West Virginia
Unincorporated communities in West Virginia
Coal towns in West Virginia